The 1989 National Soccer League season, was the 13th season of the National Soccer League (NSL) in Australia.

Background
The Australian Soccer Federation began the year by announcing that the NSL would be televised on ABC rather than on SBS who had shown the league since 1979. SBS challenged the decision in the New South Wales Supreme Court and were allowed to show matches in rounds 1 and 2 before the court found in favour of the ABC.

League table

Finals series

Individual awards
Player of the Year: Zlatko Nastevski (Marconi Fairfield)
U-21 Player of the Year: Paul Trimboli (South Melbourne)
Top Scorer: Zlatko Nastevski (Marconi Fairfield) – 20 goals
Coach of the Year: Bertie Mariani (Marconi Fairfield)

References

- NSL Awards
Australia - List of final tables (RSSSF)
1989 NSL Playoff results at ozfootball

National Soccer League (Australia) seasons
1
Aus